Franck Priou (born 17 October 1963 ) is a French former professional football player and current manager of US Marseille Endoume.

Career

Playing career
Priou, who played as a striker, played mainly in Ligue 1 and Ligue 2 for Istres, Lyon, Mulhouse, Sochaux, Cannes, Saint-Etienne, Caen and Martigues.

He was the leading goalscorer in Ligue 2 in 1993.

Coaching career
After retiring as a player, Priou was manager of Istres B team, Consolat Marseille and Gap, leading the team to the Championnat National in 2010. In 2010, he was appointed manager of Martigues. The following year he joined Fréjus, but left the club after six months in charge. He coached FC Mulhouse in 2016. In July 2018 he was appointed as manager of FC Istres. He left the role at the end of the 2018–19 season.

In December 2019, he was appointed manager of US Marseille Endoume.

References

External links
 
 

1963 births
Living people
Association football forwards
French footballers
FC Istres players
Olympique Lyonnais players
FC Mulhouse players
FC Sochaux-Montbéliard players
AS Cannes players
AS Saint-Étienne players
Stade Malherbe Caen players
FC Martigues players
Ligue 1 players
Ligue 2 players
Championnat National players
French football managers
FC Martigues managers
FC Mulhouse managers
FC Istres managers